Bridalplasty STAB was an American reality television series which premiered on the E! network, on November 28, 2010. The show features 12 women who compete to win a wedding and transformative plastic surgery procedures. The series concluded on January 30, 2011, after one season.

Premise
The show followed 12 engaged or already married women competing for the wedding of their dreams and their dream plastic surgery procedure. Each woman had a plastic surgery wishlist, and the winner of each week's wedding-themed challenge would win one plastic surgery procedure from her list.

The winner of the competition received the wedding of her dreams, and had her entire wishlist fulfilled. The husband-to-be did not see his fiancée until she revealed her new look on their wedding day. Shanna Moakler hosted, and Dr. Terry Dubrow performed the plastic surgery procedures.

Viewership and reception
The premise was widely criticized for its embrace of cosmetic surgery and "pushing the limits of medical ethics", as the American Society of Plastic Surgeons prohibits surgeons from performing procedures as the prize for a contest. Jezebel described the show as an "unhealthy" and "dangerous" self-parody of reality TV.

The season premiere was watched by 900,000 viewers; as the season progressed, this sank to 600,000 viewers, a figure described as "dismal".

Contestants

† Indicates that the contestant died after filming ended

Elimination and voting chart
Below show the list of brides and their statuses in the competition.

 The first elimination between Alexandra and Ashley was decided by a simple hand raise vote from the other brides. From Episode 2 and on, the voting would be held at the RSVP Ceremony.

 Kristen was the first bride to finish the challenge, but did not receive any surgeries on her Wish List as all the brides who completed the challenge received botox.

 Jenessa was the top bride in episode six. Since there was a tie between Netty and Lisa Marie, Jenessa had to vote in this episode's ceremony. She ended up voting for Lisa Marie to stay.

Cheyenne, Dominique, and Jenessa competed in a quiz challenge where one of them would automatically be eliminated, which Cheyenne in the end lost.

 Since Allyson was the previous Top Bride, she got to make the decision at the RSVP Ceremony of whom to compete next to in the finale. Allyson chose Jenessa to compete against her.

 Lisa Marie's vote at the Final RSVP Ceremony was not revealed due to Allyson already receiving the number of votes to win.

 The bride who won Bridalplasty.
 The bride was the top bride after finishing the challenge first.
 The bride was safe from elimination, and had to vote to save one of the bottom brides.
 The bride was part of the bottom, and was at risk of being eliminated.
 The bride was cut from the competition after having the fewest votes to stay.
 The bride lost the challenge and was immediately cut from the competition.

Episodes

References

External links
 

2010 American television series debuts
2011 American television series endings
2010s American reality television series
E! original programming
English-language television shows
Fashion-themed reality television series
Makeover reality television series
Television series by 51 Minds Entertainment
Television series about plastic surgery
Wedding television shows